Flower Power is the fourth studio album by the progressive rock band the Flower Kings, which was released in 1999. It is also their second double-CD and includes the nearly one-hour-long epic composition, "Garden of Dreams".

A Japanese edition was released that contained some bonus tracks at the end of each disc.

Track listing

Disc One

Disc Two

Credits
 Roine Stolt – guitars, lead vocals, keyboards
 Tomas Bodin – keyboards
 Hasse Fröberg – vocals
 Michael Stolt – bass guitar
 Jaime Salazar – drumkit & percussion
 Hasse Bruniusson – percussion & odd voices

Production
 Stefan Bodin – photography
 Tomas Bodin – assistant engineer, mixing assistant
 Tomas Eriksson – pre-mastering engineer
 Lilian Forsberg – photography
 Dexter Frank Jr. (i.e. Roine Stolt) – engineer
 Per Nordin – photography
 Roine Stolt – photography

References

1999 albums
The Flower Kings albums
Inside Out Music albums